Carboniferous is a studio album from the Italian band Zu. It was the group's first album for Ipecac Records.

Reception
Initial critical response to Carboniferous was very positive. At Metacritic, which assigns a normalized rating out of 100 to reviews from mainstream critics, the album has received an average score of 83, based on ten reviews.

Track listing
 "Ostia" – 4:55
 "Chthonian" – 6:48 (feat. King Buzzo)
 "Carbon" – 4:24
 "Beata Viscera" – 3:57
 "Erinys" – 3:43
 "Soulympics" – 5:05 (feat. Mike Patton)
 "Axion" – 5:21
 "Mimosa Hostilis" – 4:09
 "Obsidian" – 6:29
 "Orc" – 5:20 (feat. Mike Patton)

References

External links
 

2009 albums
Zu (band) albums
Ipecac Recordings albums